Dig It may refer to:
 Dig It (Klaus Schulze album), 1980
 Dig It!, a 1958 jazz album by The Red Garland Quintet
 Dig-It (Lee Konitz and Ted Brown album), recorded in 1996 and released in 1999 
 "Dig It" (Beatles song), 1970
 "Dig It" (Holes song), 2003
 "Dig It" (Skinny Puppy song), 1986